Ángeles SUD Fútbol Club Morelos is a Mexican football club that plays in the Liga Premier – Serie B, is located in Xochitepec, Morelos.

History
The team was founded in April 2020 with the aim of enrolling in the Liga de Balompié Mexicano, however, it was ultimately not accepted among the founding clubs of this football league since Morelos F.C., a team that sought to represent the same area, was the club accepted in the competition. 

After the refusal to enter the LBM, the team spent a year without participating in any professional competition, maintaining the activity at the amateur level. In May 2021 it was announced that the club was in the process of joining the Femexfut and thus participating in the Liga Premier de México, the third-level league of the Femexfut-affiliated league system.

Finally, on July 30, 2021, the club's entry into the Liga Premier was confirmed, being registered in Serie B, the development category of this division, which will be the club's debut in professional football.

Stadium

The Estadio Mariano Matamoros is a multi-use stadium in Xochitepec.  It is currently used mostly for football matches. The stadium has a capacity of 16,000 people and was opened in 1981.

References

Football clubs in Morelos
Association football clubs established in 2020
2020 establishments in Mexico